The following lists events that happened during 1865 in New Zealand.

Incumbents

Regal and viceregal
Head of State — Queen Victoria
Governor — Sir George Grey

Government and law
The 3rd Parliament continues.

Speaker of the House — David Monro
Premier — Edward Stafford becomes Premier on 16 October when Frederick Weld retires due to ill-health and stress.
Minister of Finance — Edward Stafford takes up the post on 31 October after William Fitzherbert loses the post when the Weld government ends on 16 October.
Chief Justice — Hon Sir George Arney

Main centre leaders
Mayor of Dunedin — William Mason

Events 
 The New Zealand Exhibition in Dunedin runs from 12 January until 6 May 1865. 
The Capital of New Zealand is moved from Auckland to Wellington.
The Marlborough Times ceases publication. It was founded in 1864.
February – The start of the West Coast Gold Rush with rumours of gold being found.
18 February: The Press in Christchurch starts publishing a magazine, The Weekly Press. The magazine ran until 1928.
May — The West Coast Times is founded. It began as a weekly newspaper and became a daily in January 1866. It ceased publishing in 1917.
26 July: Parliament officially sits in Wellington for the first time, in the former Provincial Council chambers. (see also 1862)
30 August: The New Zealand Spectator and Cook's Strait Guardian publishes its last issue. It began in 1844.
November: The Grey River Argus begins publication in Greymouth. It published three times a week until becoming daily in 1871. The paper folded in 1966.

Sport

Horse racing
The race which becomes the New Zealand Cup in 1883, is run for the first time at Riccarton Racecourse.

Major race winners
New Zealand Cup: Rob Roy
New Zealand Derby: Egremont

Rowing
The Star Boating Club is formed in Wellington. (other sources state 1867)

Shooting
Ballinger Belt: No competition

Births
 13 May: Lindsay Buick, historian, journalist and politician (d. 1938)
 10 July: James Randall Corrigan, member of NZ Parliament

Deaths

January–June
 28 January: John Perry Robinson, Superintendent of Nelson Province
 25 February: Hoani Wiremu Hīpango, tribal leader, teacher and assessor
 12 April: Thomas Halbert, whaler, trader and founding father
 30 April (at Upper Norwood, England): Robert FitzRoy, second Governor of New Zealand (born 1805)
 5 May (at sea off Blackwall, London): Samuel Brees, artist, surveyor and engineer
 11 May: Thomas Antill, Australian cricketer and New Zealand bank manager (born 1830)
 8 June: John Morgan, missionary (born 1806)

July–December
 14 July: Nathaniel Burslem, recipient of the Victoria Cross (born 1837)
 21 July: Frederick Merriman, politician (born 1818)
 22 July: James Francis Fulloon, interpreter and public servant (born 1840)
 9 November: George Kissling, Archdeacon of Waitemata (born 1805)

See also
List of years in New Zealand
Timeline of New Zealand history
History of New Zealand
Military history of New Zealand
Timeline of the New Zealand environment
Timeline of New Zealand's links with Antarctica

References
General
 Romanos, J. (2001) New Zealand Sporting Records and Lists. Auckland: Hodder Moa Beckett. 
Specific

External links